Neil Gunn (born 8 October 1945 in Toronto, Ontario) is a Canadian former sailor who competed in the 1972 Summer Olympics.

References

1945 births
Living people
Canadian male sailors (sport)
Olympic sailors of Canada
Sailors at the 1972 Summer Olympics – Dragon
20th-century Canadian people